Papyrus Oxyrhynchus 90 (P. Oxy. 90) is a receipt for the payment of wheat, written in Greek. The manuscript was written on papyrus in the form of a sheet. It was discovered in the Egyptian city of Oxyrhynchus. The document was written between 179-180. Currently it is housed in the British Museum (761) in London. It is known also as  P. Lond. 3 p. XXXII no. 761.

Description 

The fragment contains a receipt, and is similar to Papyrus Oxyrhynchus 89. It was written by an unknown author. It states  "that Clarus, ex-agoranomus, had deposited 8 artabae 4 choenices in the public granary". According to Grenfell and Hunt, the last two lines are "written in Greek characters, but cannot be construed as Greek. Since they do not appear to be Graecized demotic, they are possibly a cryptogram of some kind." The measurements of the fragment are 103 by 80 mm.

It was discovered by Grenfell and Hunt in 1897 in Oxyrhynchus. The text was published by Grenfell and Hunt in 1898. The fragment was examined by Frederic G. Kenyon (1907).

Text

See also 
 Oxyrhynchus Papyri
 Papyrus Oxyrhynchus 91

References

External links 
 P.Oxy.1.90 = HGV P.Oxy. 1 90 = Trismegistos 20749

2nd-century manuscripts
Ancient Egyptian objects in the British Museum
Egyptian papyri
Minya Governorate
090
Undeciphered historical codes and ciphers
Wheat